Keck Graduate Institute (KGI) is a private graduate school in Claremont, California. Founded by Henry Riggs in 1997, it is the seventh and newest member of the Claremont Colleges.

History
Henry Riggs, then president of Harvey Mudd College, established the institute in 1997 to address what he perceived as a lack of scientists trained to convert new scientific discoveries into practical uses. He also became the institute's first president, serving until 2003.

The decision to establish Keck Graduate Institute as a seventh Claremont College was met with some opposition, particularly from faculty of the other Claremont Colleges who objected to its lack of tenure, and environmentalists who opposed its plans to build a campus next to the Bernard Field Station, an area of undeveloped scrubland. The environmental issue was largely settled when KGI decided to establish its campus at a different location, and other opposition gradually faded.

The institute received a $50 million endowment from the W. M. Keck Foundation, after which it was named. It awarded its first Master of Bioscience degree in 2002.

In 2003, Sheldon Schuster became the second president in the institute's history. He took over from Riggs, who became chairman of the school's board of trustees. Schuster is a biochemist who previously served as director of the University of Florida's biotechnology research program.

Academics

Academic programs at KGI are organized into three schools: School of Applied Life Sciences, School of Pharmacy and Health Sciences, and School of Medicine. Keck Graduate Institute of Applied Life Sciences is accredited by the Accrediting Commission for Senior Colleges and Universities of the Western Association of Schools and Colleges. The School of Pharmacy and Health Sciences is accredited by the Accreditation Council for Pharmacy Education (ACPE). In August 2019, KGI appointed J. Mario Molina as dean of the new School of Medicine.

KGI also has a Master of Science in Human Genetics and Genetic Counseling program accredited by Accreditation Council for Genetic Counseling.

Research centers

KGI maintains four research centers: the Center for Rare Disease Therapies, the Center for Biomarker Research, the Science Heritage Center and the Amgen Bioprocessing Center. The Amgen Bioprocessing Center was funded by a 2004 grant of $2 million to KGI from Amgen, a pharmaceutical company based in Thousand Oaks, California.

On December 28, 2016, KGI announced a plan to start a Master of Science in Human Genetics and Genetic Counseling program funded by an additional $1.5 million grant from Amgen.

Spin-off companies
Ionian Technologies was founded in 2000, and was the first spin-off company to commercialize technology developed at KGI. Ionian focuses on molecular diagnostics for emerging and infectious diseases, and in 2004 was awarded a contract to develop a handheld biothreat detector using isothermal amplification of DNA. Other KGI startups include Zuyder Pharmaceuticals and Claremont BioSolutions.

Noted people

Noted alumni

Noted faculty

Presidents
Henry E. Riggs (1997–2003)
Sheldon Schuster (2003–present)

See also 

 Association of Independent Technological Universities

References

External links

Universities and colleges in Los Angeles County, California
Schools accredited by the Western Association of Schools and Colleges
Claremont Colleges
Biotechnology organizations
Educational institutions established in 1997
San Gabriel Valley
1997 establishments in California
Private universities and colleges in California